William Aiken House may refer to:
Gov. William Aiken House, a Charleston, South Carolina home of South Carolina governor William Aiken, Jr.
William Aiken House and Associated Railroad Structures, includes the Charleston, South Carolina home of railway founder William Aiken, Sr., father of the governor